Sabatia campestris (Texas star; also prairie rose-gentian, prairie sabatia, meadow pink) is a species of Sabatia, native to the south-central United States, from Texas east to Mississippi and north to Iowa and Illinois. It is also locally naturalized in New England.

The flowers are produced in open, long-stalked cymes at the top of the stems; the flower corolla is about 40 mm diameter, with five pink (rarely white) lobes with bluntly acute apices, and a contrasting bright yellow central 'eye'; they are hermaphrodite (contain both male and female organs). The fruit is a capsule containing numerous small seeds.

Habitat
Its natural habitats are sandy prairies, woodland edges, and stream banks.

Cultivation and uses
Sabatia campestris is cultivated as an ornamental plant in gardens, where it requires moist soil and partial to full sun.

It can be used for medical purposes as an anti-periodic and tonic. It is also possible to obtain a herbal tea from the plant.

References

External links
Photo of herbarium specimen at Missouri Botanical Garden, collected in the Republic of Texas in 1843

campestris
Flora of the United States
Plants described in 1836
Medicinal plants of North America